Our Lady of the Assumption Church may refer to:

Azerbaijan
 Our Lady of Assumption Church (Bulakan)

Canada
 Our Lady of the Assumption (Windsor, Ontario)

France
 Église Notre-Dame de l'Assomption, Bergheim
 Église Notre-Dame de l'Assomption, Lorient, on the Caribbean island of Saint Barthélemy
 Église Notre-Dame de l'Assomption, Metz
 Église Notre-Dame de l'Assomption, Rouffach
 Our Lady of the Assumption Church, Sainte-Marie

Ireland
 Church of Our Lady of the Assumption, Ballyfermot, Dublin, Ireland

Philippines
 Our Lady of the Assumption Parish Church, or Maragondon Church, Cavite
 Church of Our Lady of the Assumption, Ilocos Sur or Santa Maria Church

Russia
 Our Lady of the Assumption Church, Novocherkassk

United Kingdom
 Church of the Assumption of Our Lady, Torquay, Devon, England
 Church of Our Lady of the Assumption, Englefield Green, Surrey, England
 Our Lady of the Assumption Church, Rhyl, Denbighshire, Wales

United States
 Our Lady of the Assumption Church (Fairfield, Connecticut)
 Our Lady of the Assumption Church (Westport, Connecticut)

See also
 Cathedral of Our Lady of the Assumption (disambiguation), including uses of Our Lady of the Assumption Cathedral
 Cathedral of the Assumption (disambiguation)
 Church of the Assumption (disambiguation)